Alfred James Bailey (1868 – 1948), was a British Trade Unionist and Liberal Party politician, serving as Lord Mayor of Sheffield.

Early life and trade unionism
Bailey was born in Scredington in Lincolnshire in 1868.

Bailey was Secretary of the Yorkshire branch of the National Amalgamated Union of Labour, and from 1896 served as one of its official delegates. He also represented his union at the Trades Union Congress. In 1924 following the merger of a number of trade unions he became a district secretary of the National Union of General and Municipal Workers.

Political career
Bailey was elected to Sheffield City Council as a Liberal in 1904 to represent Darnall Ward. He was re-elected in 1907 defeating the Labour Party candidate, Joseph Pointer. He was Liberal candidate for the Central division of Sheffield at both 1910 General Elections, sponsored by the Sheffield Federated Trades Council.  His union gave permission for the candidacy, but no financial backing. Sheffield Central was a safe Conservative seat. At the first election in January he increased the Liberal vote share by 3.5% against the national trend. He narrowed the gap further in the December election, to just 184 votes. He was an Independent Labour candidate for Sheffield Central at the 1918 General Election, sponsored by his union. At this election he saw his share of the vote fall and he again finished second. He did not stand for parliament again.

He continued to be elected to Sheffield City Council until 1923 when he was appointed as an Alderman. After the Great War he identified with the 'Citizen's Party' against the Labour Party. He served as Lord Mayor of Sheffield from 1924-1925.

Electoral record

References

1868 births
1948 deaths
Liberal Party (UK) parliamentary candidates
Liberal-Labour (UK) politicians
Trade unionists from Lincolnshire
Lord Mayors of Sheffield
Liberal Party (UK) councillors
People from North Kesteven District